The Senegalese League Cup is the knockout tournament of the Senegalese football featuring clubs from Ligue 1 and 2. It was created in 2009 and is organized by the LSFP, the Senegal FA.  The winner competes in the Assemblée Nationale Cup, the super cup of Senegal.

Winners

References

National association football league cups
Football in Senegal